Tilka Majhi Bhagalpur University, formerly Bhagalpur University, is a public university in Bhagalpur, Bihar, India. It was established on 12 July 1960, having local colleges initially associated with Patna University. The name was changed from Bhagalpur University to Tilka Manjhi Bhagalpur University in 1991 in commemoration of  Tilka Majhi, a freedom fighter.

Academics
T. M. Bhagalpur University has six faculties: science, social science, humanities, commerce, management studies, and law. It has five research centres: Agro-Economic Research Centre, Centre of Bioinformatics, University Computer Centre, Centre for Regional Studies and Research Service Centre.

Colleges
Its jurisdiction extends over two districts, Banka and Bhagalpur.

Affiliated colleges
 A.K. Gopalan College, Sultanganj, Bhagalpur	
B. L. Sarraf Commerce College, Naugachia
C.M. College, Bounsi, Banka
D.N. Singh College, Bhusia, Rajaun, Banka
L.N.B.J. Mahila College, Bhramarpur, Bhagalpur		
Mahadeo Singh College, Bhagalpur
Muslim Minority College, Bhagalpur	
S.D.M.Y. College, Dhoraiya, Banka	
S.S.P.S. College, Shambhuganj, Banka	
Sharda Jhunjhunwala Mahila College, Bhagalpur
Sarvajanik College Sarvodaynagar, Banka	
Tarar College, Tarar, Ghogha, Bhagalpur

Constituent Colleges
 Bhagalpur National College
 G. B. College, Naugachia, Bhagalpur
 Jay Prakash College, Narayanpur
 Madan Ahilya Mahila College, Naugachia, Bhagalpur
 Marwari College, Bhagalpur
 Murarka College, Sultanganj
 P. B. S. College, Banka
 S. S. V. College, Kahalgaon
 Sabour College, Sabour, Bhagalpur
 Sunderwati Mahila College, Bhagalpur
 T.N.B. College, Bhagalpur
 T. N. B. Law College, Bhagalpur

Notable alumni

References

External links

 
Education in Bhagalpur district
Universities and colleges in Bhagalpur
Educational institutions established in 1960
1960 establishments in Bihar
Universities in Bihar